Cornelius Petrus Mulder is a South African politician. He serves as a member of the National Assembly of South Africa.

Early life
Corné Mulder graduated from Potchefstroom University, with a B.Juris degree, followed by an LL.B in 1982. He later completed doctoral research at the Institute for Advanced Legal Studies at the University of London and the Max-Planck-Institut für Ausländisches öffentliches Recht und Völkerrecht at Heidelberg, Germany.

Career
Since 1994, Mulder has served as a member of the National Assembly of South Africa, where he represents Western Cape. He is a member of Freedom Front Plus, where he serves as chief parliamentary whip and Western Cape's leader.

References

Living people
People from the Western Cape
Politicians from the Western Cape
North-West University alumni
Members of the National Assembly of South Africa
Freedom Front Plus politicians
1961 births